Canned Heat '70 Concert  Recorded Live in Europe is a 1970 live album by Canned Heat. The album is taken from various locations on live concert European tour right before Alan Wilson's death and is the band's first officially released live album.

Track listing
"That's All Right Mama" (Arthur "Big Boy" Crudup) – 9:02
"Bring It on Home" (Willie Dixon) – 6:18
"Pulling Hair Blues" (Alan Wilson, Samuel L. Taylor) – 9:20
Medley: "Back Out on the Road" (Robert Hite, Jr.) / "On the Road Again" (Floyd Jones, Alan Wilson, Tommy Johnson) – 6:00
"London Blues" (Alan Wilson) – 7:53
"Let's Work Together" (Wilbert Harrison) – 4:50
"Goodbye for Now" (Adolfo de la Parra, Harvey Mandel) – 3:25

Personnel
Canned Heat
Bob Hite – vocals
Alan Wilson – slide guitar, vocals, harmonica
Harvey Mandel – lead guitar
Larry Taylor – bass
Fito de la Parra – drums

Production
Skip Taylor – "friend, manager and producer"
Canned Heat – producer

References

Canned Heat albums
1970 live albums
Liberty Records live albums
Albums produced by Bob Hite
Albums produced by Alan Wilson (musician)
Albums produced by Harvey Mandel
Albums produced by Larry Taylor
Albums produced by Adolfo de la Parra
Live albums recorded at the Royal Albert Hall